Anastasiia Alekseyevna Goreeva (Russian: Анастасия Алексеевна Гореева; born 27 August 1999) is a Russian biathlete.

Career 
Goreeva has been engaged in biathlon since 2007.

Anastasiia made her international debut at the 2017 Junior World Championships in Osrblie. As part of the Russian national team, she became the world champion in the youth women's relay. She also finished 13th in the individual race, 12th in the sprint and 8th in the pursuit. She improved her results at the next 2018 Junior World Championships in Otepää, finishing 3rd in the individual race, 4th in the sprint and becoming the champion in the pursuit.

Goreeva made her World Cup debut in the first race of the 2020-21 season in Kontiolahti, finishing 56th with four penalties.

Biathlon results

Junior/Youth World Championships
4 medals (2 gold, 1 silver, 1 bronze)

References

External links

Russian female biathletes
Living people
1999 births
People from Pavlovo-Posadsky District
Sportspeople from Moscow Oblast